Ralf Schehr (born 28 October 1953) is a German football coach. He is currently youth coordinator for Eintracht Norderstedt.

He was the second team coach at Hamburger SV when he took charge of the main team with two games left to play in the 1996/97 season. They beat Borussia Dortmund 2:1 in his first game to become safe from relegation. The second game was a tie and he remains the only HSV coach who is unbeaten in his career at the helm.

References

1953 births
Living people
German football managers
Hamburger SV managers
Bundesliga managers